Karl-Bernhard Kirp (24 August 1895 in Valga – 4 May 1930 in Tartu) was an Estonian politician. He was a member of Estonian Constituent Assembly, representing the Estonian People's Party. He was a member of the assembly since 9 March 1920. He replaced Jaan Poska. On 11 March 1920, he resigned his position and he was replaced by Jakob Ploompuu.

References

1895 births
1930 deaths
People from Valga, Estonia
People from Kreis Walk
Estonian People's Party politicians
Members of the Estonian Constituent Assembly